Loren Berto Alfonso Domínguez (born 23 February 1995) is a Cuban-born Azerbaijani boxer in the light heavyweight (–81 kg) discipline.

Romero won the gold medal at the 2019 European Games in the light heavyweight category. He competed in the men's light heavyweight event at the 2020 Summer Olympics, winning a bronze medal.

References

1995 births
Living people
Azerbaijani male boxers
Olympic boxers of Azerbaijan
Boxers at the 2020 Summer Olympics
Boxers at the 2019 European Games
European Games gold medalists for Azerbaijan
Lightweight boxers
Cuban emigrants to Azerbaijan
European Games medalists in boxing
Medalists at the 2020 Summer Olympics
Olympic medalists in boxing
Olympic bronze medalists for Azerbaijan